Anastasios Papakonstantinou (born 27 December 1963) is a Greek bobsledder. He competed in the four man event at the 1998 Winter Olympics.

References

1963 births
Living people
Greek male bobsledders
Olympic bobsledders of Greece
Bobsledders at the 1998 Winter Olympics
Place of birth missing (living people)